Andriyenko or Andriienko is a gender-neutral Ukrainian surname. Notable people with the surname include:

 Denys Andriyenko (born 1980), Ukrainian footballer
 Mykhailo Andriienko-Nechytailo (1894–1982), Ukrainian painter

Ukrainian-language surnames
Patronymic surnames
Surnames from given names